The 60th edition of the KNVB Cup started on October 8, 1977. The final was played on May 5, 1978: AZ from Alkmaar (at the time called AZ'67) beat Ajax 1–0 and won the cup for the first time. During the quarter and semi-finals, two-legged matches were played.

Teams
 All 18 participants of the Eredivisie 1977-78, entering in the second round
 All 19 participants of the Eerste Divisie 1977-78
 9 teams from lower (amateur) leagues

First round
The matches of the first round were played on October 8 and 9, 1977.

1 Eerste Divisie; A Amateur teams

Second round
The matches of the second round were played on November 19 and 20, 1977. The Eredivisie clubs entered the tournament here.

E Eredivisie

Round of 16
The matches of the round of 16 were played between December 21 and 26, 1977.

Quarter finals
The quarter finals were played between February 1 and March 15, 1978.

Semi-finals
The semi-finals were played on March 30 and April 19, 1978.

Final

AZ would participate in the Cup Winners' cup

See also
Eredivisie 1977-78
Eerste Divisie 1977-78

References

External links
 Netherlands Cup Full Results 1970–1994 by the RSSSF

1977-78
1977–78 domestic association football cups
KNVB Cup